Facundo Fabián Trinidad Carballo (born 14 April 2002) is a Uruguayan professional footballer who plays as a winger for Liverpool Montevideo.

Career
Trinidad joined youth academy of Liverpool Montevideo in 2015. He was promoted to senior team in 2020 season and made his professional debut on 8 August 2020 against Rentistas. He came on as an 86th-minute substitute for Bruno Correa as the match ended in a 1–1 draw.

Personal life
Trinidad is the nephew of Uruguayan international footballers Carlos Sánchez and Nicolás de la Cruz.

Career statistics

Honours
Liverpool Montevideo
 Supercopa Uruguaya: 2023

References

External links
 

2002 births
Living people
Footballers from Montevideo
Association football midfielders
Association football wingers
Uruguayan footballers
Uruguayan Primera División players
Liverpool F.C. (Montevideo) players